Maly Uzen or Kishi Uzen (Kishi Ózen), also known as the Saryozen in Kazakhstan, is a river in Saratov Oblast of Russia and West Kazakhstan Province of Kazakhstan.

The river is used for water supply and irrigation. Water quality tests conducted in 2005 in the Russian section indicated 'moderately polluted'. A 2011 report by the United Nations Economic Commission for Europe listed the discharge of wastewater, surface run-off, sediments and riverbank erosion as damaging to water quality.

Course
The Maly Uzen has its sources on the western edge of the Obshchy Syrt to the north of Yershov town. It flows in a roughly SSE direction over the steppes of the Caspian Depression. The river runs parallel to the Bolshoy Uzen, some  further east. The Maly Uzen has its mouth in lake Saryaydyn, part of the Kamys-Samar Lakes of West-Kazakhstan. Lake Balykty Sarkyl lies between the Maly Uzen and the Bolshoy Uzen.

Most of the river's waters come from melting snow and its discharge is at its peak in April. Some stretches of the river usually dry up completely in the summer. The Maly Uzen freezes over in December, and stays icebound to the end of March or beginning of April.

References

External links

Rivers of Saratov Oblast
Rivers of Kazakhstan
International rivers of Europe
Kazakhstan–Russia border